I Love You, You're Perfect, Now Change is a musical comedy with book and lyrics by Joe DiPietro and music by Jimmy Roberts. It is the second-longest running Off-Broadway musical.  The musical was nominated for the Outer Critics Circle Award as Outstanding Off-Broadway musical in 1997.

Production history
The musical premiered Off-Broadway at the Westside Theatre on August 1, 1996 and closed on July 27, 2008, after 5,003 performances. Directed by Joel Bishoff, the cast featured Jordan Leeds, Robert Roznowski, Jennifer Simard, and Melissa Weil.

It was first produced in the town where playwright Joe DiPietro was born, Teaneck, New Jersey. This production ran from February 24 to March 12, 1995 at the American Stage Company Theater (Artistic Director James Vagias and Managing Director, Glenn Cherrits), a professional theatre in residence on the campus of Fairleigh Dickinson University, Teaneck, NJ. Directed by Joel Bishoff, the cast included Robert Roznowski, Robert Michael and Melissa Weil.

The musical was first produced in the UK at the Churchill Theatre, Bromley, followed by a short season in the West End Comedy Theatre from July 28, 1999 to September 25, 1999. Directed by Joel Bishoff, the cast featured Clive Carter, Shona Lindsay, Gillian Kirkpatrick and Russell Wilcox. It was revived in London at the Jermyn Street Theatre, running from March 1, 2005 to March 26, presented by Popular Productions Ltd. This production then opened in Dubai in 2006 and by Maple Giant at the Bridewell Theatre in 2011.  A Mandarin Chinese version debuted in Beijing, China, on June 20, 2007, and it had been also reproduced by LANCreators, Taiwan's only group producing Broadway musicals, and performed, in English, at the Crown Theatre, Taipei, from November 3, 2007.

It has been translated into at least 17 languages, including Hebrew, Spanish, Dutch, Hungarian, Czech, Slovak, Slovene, Japanese, Korean, Italian, Portuguese, German, Catalan, Finnish, Mandarin, Cantonese, Norwegian, Polish, French and Turkish.

It has played sit-down productions in Los Angeles, Toronto, Boston, Chicago, London, Dubai, Tel Aviv, Mexico City, Guadalajara, Barcelona, Istanbul, Amsterdam, Budapest, Sydney, Prague, Bratislava, Seoul, Warsaw, Milan, Rio de Janeiro, Johannesburg, Dublin, Buenos Aires, Berlin, Hong Kong, Shanghai, Beijing, Taipei, Tokyo, Manila, Wiesbaden, Munich, Heidelberg and Christchurch.

In 2008, Kookaburra: The National Musical Theatre Company toured NSW Australia with version of the production with Australian accents and references. This production was directed by Darren Yap, and starred Hayden Tee, Katrina Retallick, Marika Aubrey and Anthony Harkin. Its near sold-out season scheduled for Sydney in April 2009 was cancelled after the sudden collapse of Kookaburra.

In 2015, I Love You, You're Perfect, Now Change ran in London in the small studio space named Above The Arts in London's West End in Leicester Square. It starred Julie Atherton, Simon Lipkin, Gina Beck and Samuel Holmes.

In 2017, there was a short run at George Street Playhouse at their interim theater in New Brunswick, New Jersey, starring Mitchell Jarvis, Karen Burthwright, Lindsay Nicole Chambers, and George Merrick.

In 2019, a Cantonese film adaptation directed by Wong Cho-lam was released.

Synopsis
I Love You, You're Perfect, Now Change is presented in the form of a series of vignettes connected by the central theme of love and relationships. The play's tagline is "Everything you have ever secretly thought about dating, romance, marriage, lovers, husbands, wives and in-laws, but were afraid to admit."  With few exceptions, the scenes stand independent of the others, but progress in a fashion designed to suggest an overall arc to relationships throughout the course of one's life. A first date, for example, comes before scenes dealing with marriage, and scenes dealing with marriage come before those dealing with child bearing. Despite the large number of characters, the show is typically done with a comparatively small cast: the original Off-Broadway production uses a cast of four.

Musical numbers
Source: guidetomusicaltheatre.com

The current licensed version available for production includes a new song in Act I, Scene 2. The song "We Had It All" was added during the Off-Broadway run and was part of several tours of the show.

References

External links
Internet Off-Broadway Database Listing

1996 musicals
Off-Broadway musicals